The 1966 Macdonald Brier the Canadian men's national curling championship, was held March 7 to 11, 1966 at the Halifax Forum in Halifax, Nova Scotia. After the Brier the year before broke attendance records, the 1966 edition only drew 11,905 fans. At the time, only the 1947 Brier drew fewer fans.

Both Alberta and Ontario finished round robin play with identical 8–2 records, necessitating a tiebreaker playoff between the two teams for the Brier championship. Team Alberta, who was skipped by Ron Northcott won the Brier Tankard over Ontario 7-6 in the tiebreaker playoff. This was the ninth time that Alberta won the Brier championship and the first of three Briers that Northcott won as a skip.

Northcott and his team would go on to represent Canada at the 1966 Scotch Cup, the World Curling Championship, which they won.

Event Summary
After the Thursday afternoon draw (Draw 8), there were five teams with a legitimate shot at the championship. Alberta was sitting at 6-1 with Ontario sitting at 6-2, Manitoba and Saskatchewan both sitting at 5-2, and Nova Scotia sitting at 5-3.

The Thursday evening draw saw the standings tighten up even more. Manitoba scored two in the final end for a 9-8 victory over Alberta, Saskatchewan rolled past PEI 17-5, and Ontario beat Newfoundland 10-8 while Nova Scotia drew a bye. This caused four teams to now be sitting at two losses heading into the final two draws on Friday.

The penultimate draw on Friday morning saw Alberta beat British Columbia 10-8, Nova Scotia beating Quebec 9-6, and Saskatchewan rolling past New Brunswick 14-5 while Ontario drew a bye. However, Newfoundland (who entered the draw with only one win) pulled off a stunning upset as they blew out Manitoba 17-5. This would cause a three-way tie between Alberta, Ontario, and Saskatchewan with 7-2 records while Manitoba and Nova Scotia both now sitting a game back at 6-3. With matchups featuring Manitoba and Ontario along with Nova Scotia and Saskatchewan in the final draw, there was a high chance that at least one tiebreaker would be needed to determine the Brier champion after round robin play concluded.

The final draw of the round robin on Friday afternoon ended up living up to its hype. Saskatchewan, who was one of the teams tied for first led Nova Scotia 7-5 heading into the twelfth and final end without hammer. Nova Scotia would end up scoring two and forced the game into an extra end. Nova Scotia then would steal one in the extra end to beat Saskatchewan 8-7 as both teams now needed Alberta and Ontario to both lose to still have a shot at the championship via a five-way tiebreaker. However, this would not be up to fruition as Alberta pulled away late against PEI for a 7-3 win eliminating Manitoba, Nova Scotia, and Saskatchewan from contention. Ontario won a back-and-forth game with Manitoba as Ontario broke a 7-all tie with two in the final end for a 9-7 victory and forcing a tiebreaker playoff with Alberta for the Brier championship.

In the playoff, Alberta skip Ron Northcott missed three last-rock takeouts in a row to go down 0–3 after the first three ends. Northcott drew for a single in the fourth,  before Ontario scored a single in the fifth. Alberta then scored two in six, then stole a single in the seventh when Ontario skip Joe Gurowka was heavy on a draw attempt. The teams exchanged singles over the next four ends, with the game tied after 11. Northcott had attempted to blank the eleventh to carry over hammer to the 12th and deciding end, but missed, giving the hammer back to Ontario. In the last end, Northcott wicked off an Ontario stone behind cover to lie one with his last shot. Gurowka elected to counter with a draw to the button, but was wide and heavy, giving the championship to Alberta.

Teams
The teams were as follows:

Round Robin standings

Round Robin results
All draw times are listed in Atlantic Time (UTC-4:00)

Draw 1
Monday, March 7 3:00 PM

Draw 2
Monday, March 7 8:00 PM

Draw 3
Tuesday, March 8 9:00 AM

Draw 4
Tuesday, March 8 2:30 PM

Draw 5
Wednesday, March 9 2:30 PM

Draw 6
Wednesday, March 9 8:00 PM

Draw 7
Thursday, March 10 9:00 AM

Draw 8
Thursday, March 10 2:30 PM

Draw 9
Thursday, March 10 8:00 PM

Draw 10
Friday, March 11 9:00 AM

Draw 11
Friday, March 11 2:30 PM

Tiebreaker
Friday, March 11 7:30 PM

Awards

All-Star Team
The media selected the following curlers as all-stars:

Ross G.L. Harstone Trophy 
The Ross Harstone Trophy was presented for the first time in 1966. The award is presented to the player chosen by their peers as the curler in the Brier who best represents Harstone's high ideals of good sportsmanship, observance of the rules, exemplary conduct and curling ability.

References
Curling Canada: 1966 Macdonald Brier

External links
1966 MacDonald Brier on YouTube

1967
Curling competitions in Halifax, Nova Scotia
1966 in Nova Scotia
March 1966 sports events in Canada
1966 in Canadian curling
20th century in Halifax, Nova Scotia